Ryen Slegr is a Los Angeles-based musician best known for being a member of the rock band Ozma. He is also affiliated with The Rentals, Weezer, and Rachel Haden.

The Rentals 
In 2006, Slegr performed with The Rentals on their U.S. tour with Ozma. He also engineered and played guitar on The Rentals' 2014 Polyvinyl release Lost in Alphaville.

Weezer 
Slegr co-wrote the song "Eulogy for a Rock Band" on Weezer's 2014 Universal Records release Everything Will Be Alright in the End.

Miscellaneous 
In 2012, Slegr played guitar and keyboards for Rachel Haden at several shows in Los Angeles and San Francisco in a band with Adam Phaler of Jawbreaker and Warren Defever of His Name is Alive.

Education 
Slegr graduated from the University of California, Los Angeles with a degree in history. He also studied Japanese court music called Gagaku at UCLA and took various music classes at Pasadena City College, including Spud Murphy's Equal Interval System.

Discography

Ozma 
 Boomtown (2014)
 Pasadena (About A Girl/Sony BMG, 2007)
 Spending Time on the Borderline (Kung Fu, 2003)
 The Doubble Donkey Disc (Kung Fu, 2001)
 Rock and Roll Part Three (Kung Fu, 2000)

The Rentals 
 Lost in Alphaville (Polyvinyl Record Co., 2014)
 Songs About Time (2009)
 The Last Little Life EP (Boompa Records, 2007)

Weezer 
 "Everything Will Be Alright In The End" (2014)

Ryen Slegr 
 Eleven Runners (2011)

References 

1979 births
Living people
American male composers
American male guitarists
American male singer-songwriters
American audio engineers
University of California, Los Angeles alumni
The Rentals members
21st-century American singers
21st-century American guitarists
21st-century American keyboardists
21st-century American male singers
American singer-songwriters